William John Sherwood (1871 – 14 March 1955) was a British trade unionist and politician.

Born in Hartlepool, Sherwood left school at the age of twelve.  He joined the National Union of General Workers and began working full-time for the union in 1900, later becoming its President.  He also became active in the Labour Party, and was elected to Hartlepool Town Council.  He stood unsuccessfully for the party in The Hartlepools at the 1918 general election, then in Darlington at the 1922 general election, 1923 by-election and 1923 general election.

In 1925, Sherwood was elected as President of the Federation of Engineering and Shipbuilding Trades, holding the post until 1933.  In 1924, the National Union of General Workers became part of the National Union of General and Municipal Workers, and Sherwood became its National Industrial Officer.  He also served on the General Council of the Trades Union Congress for many years, and was its representative to the American Federation of Labour in 1927.  He retired in 1937.

References

1871 births
1955 deaths
Councillors in County Durham
English trade unionists
Labour Party (UK) parliamentary candidates
People from Hartlepool